The name Julio has been used for six tropical cyclones in the Eastern Pacific Ocean.
 Tropical Storm Julio (1984) – a weak storm with no impacts on land
 Hurricane Julio (1990) – a Category 3 hurricane with no impacts on land
 Tropical Storm Julio (2002) – weak storm that struck the southwestern coast of Mexico, affecting Guerrero and Michoacán states
 Tropical Storm Julio (2008) – moderately-strong storm that struck the Baja California peninsula
 Hurricane Julio (2014) – a Category 3 hurricane that threatened the Hawaiian Islands but stayed well to the north in the central Pacific Ocean
 Tropical Storm Julio (2020) – a small and weak storm that stayed at sea

Pacific hurricane set index articles